The Washingtonian was one of two daily American  named passenger trains operated by the Baltimore and Ohio Railroad (B&O) during the 1940s–1950s between Baltimore, Maryland and Cleveland, Ohio, via Washington, D. C. and Pittsburgh, Pennsylvania. It was the last B&O long-haul passenger train to be powered by a steam locomotive from the venerable railroad's namesake city.  

In earlier decades the train ran from the B&O's Chestnut Street station in Philadelphia to Washington, DC's Union Station.

Inaugurated on April 27, 1941, the Washingtonian was primarily a daytime train with a morning departure, in contrast to B&O's other train on the route, the Cleveland Night Express. Between Pittsburgh and Cleveland, the Washingtonians cars left B&O rails and were coupled to the Steel King train of the Pittsburgh and Lake Erie Railroad (P&LE) to Youngstown, Ohio, where the Erie Railroad handled the train to Union Terminal in Cleveland. 

The Washingtonian was regularly operated with steam locomotives on B&O's Baltimore–Washington, D. C.–Cumberland, Maryland mainline until November 3, 1953, when it was finally assigned diesel locomotives. The diesel-powered, conventionally-equipped  Washingtonian was replaced on October 27, 1956, by the faster and more economical Budd Rail Diesel Car (RDC) Daylight Speedliner between Philadelphia, Baltimore, Washington, and Pittsburgh, reducing operating expenses by half. The streamlined Daylight Speedliner's seven-hour schedule on B&O's  Baltimore–Pittsburgh route also trimmed almost two hours travel time compared to the Washingtonian.

Schedule and equipment
The westbound Washingtonian, operating as Train # 21, left Baltimore at 9:00 a.m., arriving in Cleveland twelve hours later at 9:00 p.m. Eastbound, the Washingtonian was designated Train # 22. The train's consist was typically a pair of baggage/express cars, a Railway Post Office car, three air conditioned coaches, and a combination parlor-diner-lounge car. In the late 1940s, as many as six additional coaches were added on weekends to accommodate the throngs of East Coast-bound passengers boarding the train at the numerous Appalachian Mountain communities along the B&O's right-of-way. 

In its final year of service, westbound Washingtonian Train # 21 operated on the following schedule (principal stops shown in blue, P&LE–Erie Steel King denoted in yellow):

References

External links
 B&O Train 21, The Washingtonian, animation between Brunswick, Maryland and Harpers Ferry, West Virginia

Named passenger trains of the United States
Passenger trains of the Baltimore and Ohio Railroad
Passenger trains of the Erie Railroad
Transportation in Cleveland
Transportation in Baltimore
Transportation in Pittsburgh
Passenger rail transportation in Washington, D.C.
Passenger rail transportation in Delaware
Passenger rail transportation in Maryland
Passenger rail transportation in Ohio
Passenger rail transportation in Pennsylvania
Passenger rail transportation in New Jersey
Railway services introduced in 1941
Railway services discontinued in 1956